The Liberation of Paris was a military battle that took place during World War II from 19 August 1944 until the German garrison surrendered the French capital on 25 August 1944. Paris had been occupied by Nazi Germany since the signing of the Second Compiègne Armistice on 22 June 1940, after which the Wehrmacht occupied northern and western France.

The liberation began when the French Forces of the Interior—the military structure of the French Resistance—staged an uprising against the German garrison upon the approach of the US Third Army, led by General George Patton. On the night of 24 August, elements of General Philippe Leclerc's 2nd French Armored Division made their way into Paris and arrived at the Hôtel de Ville shortly before midnight. The next morning, 25 August, the bulk of the 2nd Armored Division and US 4th Infantry Division and other allied units entered the city. Dietrich von Choltitz, commander of the German garrison and the military governor of Paris, surrendered to the French at the Hôtel Le Meurice, the newly established French headquarters. General Charles de Gaulle of the French Army arrived to assume control of the city as head of the Provisional Government of the French Republic.

Background

The Allied strategy emphasized destroying the German forces retreating towards the Rhine, the French Forces of the Interior (the armed force of the French Resistance), led by Henri Rol-Tanguy, staged an uprising in Paris.

The Falaise Pocket battle (12–21 August), the final phase of Operation Overlord, was still going on, and General Dwight D. Eisenhower, the Supreme Commander of the Supreme Headquarters Allied Expeditionary Force, did not consider the liberation of Paris a primary objective. The goal of the U.S. and British Armed Forces was to destroy the German forces, and therefore end World War II in Europe, which would allow the Allies to concentrate all their efforts on the Pacific front.

The French Resistance began to rise against the Germans in Paris on 15 August, but the Allies were still pushing the Germans toward the Rhine and did not want to get embroiled in a battle for the liberation of Paris. The Allies thought that it was too early to take Paris. They were aware that Adolf Hitler had ordered the German military to completely destroy the city in the event of an Allied attack; Paris was considered to have too great a value, culturally and historically, to risk its destruction. They were also keen to avoid a drawn-out battle of attrition like the Battle of Stalingrad or the Siege of Leningrad. It was also estimated that, in the event of a siege,  of food per day, as well as significant amounts of building materials, manpower, and engineering skill, would be required to feed the population after the liberation of Paris. Basic utilities would have to be restored, and transportation systems rebuilt. All these supplies were needed in other areas of the war effort.

De Gaulle was concerned that military rule by Allied forces would be implemented in France with the implementation of the Allied Military Government for Occupied Territories. This administration which had been planned by the American Chiefs of Staff had been approved by US President Franklin Roosevelt but had been opposed by Eisenhower. Nevertheless, De Gaulle, upon learning the French Resistance had risen up against the German occupiers, and unwilling to allow his countrymen to be slaughtered as was happening to the Polish Resistance in the Warsaw Uprising, petitioned for an immediate frontal assault. He threatened to detach the French 2nd Armored Division (2e DB) and order it to single-handedly attack the German forces in Paris, bypassing the SHAEF chain of command, if Eisenhower delayed approval unduly.

General strike (15–19 August 1944)

On 15 August, in the northeastern suburb of Pantin, 1,654 men (among them 168 captured Allied airmen), and 546 women, all political prisoners, were sent to the concentration camps of Buchenwald (men) and Ravensbrück (women), on what was to be the last convoy to Germany. Pantin had been the area of Paris from which the Germans had entered the capital in June 1940.

That same day, employees of the Paris Métro, the Gendarmerie, and Police went on strike; postal workers followed the next day. They were soon joined by workers across the city, causing a general strike to break out on 18 August.

On 16 August, 35 young FFI members were betrayed by Capitaine Serge, a double agent of the Gestapo. They had gone to a secret meeting near the Grande Cascade in the Bois de Boulogne and were gunned down there.

On 17 August, concerned that the Germans were placing explosives at strategic points around the city, Pierre Taittinger, the chairman of the municipal council, met Dietrich von Choltitz, the military governor of Paris. When Choltitz told them that he intended to slow the Allied advance as much as possible, Taittinger and Swedish consul Raoul Nordling attempted to persuade Choltitz not to destroy Paris.

Battle and Liberation

FFI uprising (19–23 August)

All over France, from the BBC and Radiodiffusion nationale (the Free French broadcaster) the population knew of the Allies' advance toward Paris after the end of the battle of Normandy. RN had been in the hands of the Vichy propaganda minister, Philippe Henriot, since November 1942 when de Gaulle took it over in an ordonnance he signed in Algiers on 4 April 1944.

On 19 August, continuing their retreat eastwards, columns of German vehicles moved down the Avenue des Champs Élysées. Posters calling citizens to arm had previously been pasted on walls by FFI members. These posters called for a general mobilization of the Parisians, arguing that "the war continues"; they called on the Parisian police, the Republican Guard, the gendarmerie, the Garde Mobile, the Groupe mobile de réserve (the police units replacing the army), and patriotic Frenchmen ("all men from 18 to 50 able to carry a weapon") to join "the struggle against the invader". Other posters assured that "victory is near" and promised "chastisement for the traitors", i.e. Vichy loyalists and collaborators. The posters were signed by the "Parisian Committee of the Liberation", in agreement with the Provisional Government of the French Republic, and under the orders of "Regional Chief Colonel Rol" (Henri Rol-Tanguy), the commander of the French Forces of the Interior in Île de France.

Then the first skirmishes between the French and the German occupiers began. Small mobile units of the Red Cross moved into the city to assist French and German wounded. That same day, the Germans detonated a barge filled with mines in the northeastern suburb of Pantin, which set mills on fire that supplied Paris with its flour.

On 20 August, as barricades began to appear, Resistance fighters organized themselves to sustain a siege. Trucks were positioned, trees cut down, and trenches were dug in the pavement to free paving stones for consolidating the barricades. These materials were transported by men, women, and children using wooden carts. Fuel trucks were attacked and captured. Civilian vehicles were commandeered, painted with camouflage, and marked with the FFI emblem. The Resistance used them to transport ammunition and orders from one barricade to another.

Skirmishes reached their peak on 22 August, when some German units tried to leave their fortifications. At 09:00 on 23 August, under Choltitz's orders, the Germans opened fire on the Grand Palais, an FFI stronghold, and German tanks fired at the barricades in the streets. Adolf Hitler gave the order to inflict maximum damage on the city.

An estimated 800 to 1,000 Resistance fighters were killed during the Battle for Paris, and another 1,500 were wounded.

Allies enter Paris (24–25 August)

On 24 August, delayed by combat and poor roads, Free French General Leclerc, commander of the 2nd French Armored Division which were equipped with American M4 Sherman tanks, halftracks and trucks disobeyed his direct superior, American corps commander Major General Leonard T. Gerow, and sent a vanguard (the colonne Dronne) to Paris, with the message that the entire division would be there the following day. The 9th Company of the Régiment de marche du Tchad which was nicknamed La Nueve (Spanish for "the nine") consisted of 160 men under French command, 146 of which were Spanish republicans. They were commanded by French Captain Raymond Dronne, who became the second uniformed Allied officer to enter Paris after Amado Granell.

At 9:22 p.m. on the night of 24 August, the 9th Company broke into the center of Paris by the Porte d'Italie. Upon entering the town hall square, the half-track "Ebro" fired the first rounds at a large group of German fusiliers and machine guns. Civilians went out to the street and sang "La Marseillaise". The leader of the 9th Company, Raymond Dronne, went to the command center of the German general Dietrich von Choltitz to request the surrender.

The 4th US Infantry Division commanded by Raymond Barton also entered through the Porte d'Italie in the early hours of the next day. The leading American regiments covered the right flank of the French 2nd Armoured and turned Eastward at the Place de la Bastille and made their way along Avenue Daumesnil heading towards the Bois de Vincennes. In the afternoon the British 30 Assault Unit had entered the Porte d'Orléans and then searched buildings for vital intelligence, later capturing the former Headquarters of Admiral Karl Dönitz, the Château de la Muette.

While awaiting the final capitulation, the 9th Company assaulted the Chamber of Deputies, the Hôtel Majestic and the Place de la Concorde. At 3:30 p.m. on 25 August, the German garrison of Paris surrendered and the Allies received Von Choltitz as a prisoner, while other French units also entered the capital.

Near the end of the battle, Resistance groups brought Allied airmen and other troops hidden in suburban towns, such as Montlhéry, into central Paris. Here, they witnessed the ragged end of the capital's occupation, de Gaulle's triumphal arrival, and the claim of "One France" liberated by the Free French and the Resistance.

The 2nd Armored Division suffered 71 killed and 225 wounded. Material losses included 35 tanks, six self-propelled guns, and 111 vehicles, "a rather high ratio of losses for an armored division", according to historian Jacques Mordal.

German surrender (25 August)

Despite repeated orders from Adolf Hitler that the French capital "must not fall into the enemy's hand except lying in complete debris", which was to be accomplished by bombing it and blowing up its bridges, Choltitz, as commander of the German garrison and military governor of Paris, surrendered on 25 August at the Hôtel Meurice. He was then driven to the Paris Police Prefecture where he signed the official surrender, then to the Gare Montparnasse, Montparnasse train station, where General Leclerc had established his command post, to sign the surrender of the German troops in Paris. Choltitz was kept prisoner until April 1947. In his memoir Brennt Paris? ("Is Paris Burning?"), first published in 1950, Choltitz describes himself as the saviour of Paris, though some historians opine that it was more the case that he had lost control of the city and had no means to carry out Hitler's orders.

De Gaulle's speech (25 August)

On 25 August, the same day that the Germans surrendered, Charles de Gaulle, President of the Provisional Government of the French Republic, moved back into the War Ministry on the Rue Saint-Dominique. He made a rousing speech to the crowd from the Hôtel de Ville.

Victory parades (26 and 29 August)
The day after de Gaulle's speech, Leclerc's French 2nd Armored Division paraded down the Champs-Élysées. A few German snipers were still active, and ones from rooftops in the Hôtel de Crillon area shot at the crowd while de Gaulle marched down the Champs Élysées and entered the Place de la Concorde.

On 29 August, the U.S. Army's 28th Infantry Division, which had assembled in the Bois de Boulogne the previous night, paraded 24-abreast up the Avenue Hoche to the Arc de Triomphe, then down the Champs Élysées. Joyous crowds greeted the Americans as the entire division, men and vehicles, marched through Paris "on its way to assigned attack positions northeast of the French capital."

Food crisis
Whilst the liberation was ongoing, it became apparent that food in Paris was getting scarcer by the day. The French rail network had largely been destroyed by Allied bombing, so getting food in had become a problem, especially since the Germans stripped Paris of its resources for themselves. The Allies realised the necessity to get Paris back on its feet and pushed a plan for food convoys to get through to the capital as soon as possible. In addition, surrounding towns and villages were requested to supply as much to Paris as possible. The Civil Affairs of SHAEF authorised the import of up to 2,400 tons of food per day at the expense of the military effort. A British food convoy labelled 'Vivres Pour Paris' entered on 29 August and US supplies were flown in via Orléans Airport before being sent in. 500 tons were delivered a day by the British and another 500 tons by the Americans. Along with French civilians outside Paris bringing in indigenous resources, within ten days the food crisis was overcome.

Aftermath

The uprising in Paris gave the newly established Free French government and its president, Charles de Gaulle, enough prestige and authority to establish a provisional French Republic. This replaced the fallen Vichy State (1940–1944), and united the politically divided French Resistance, drawing Gaullists, nationalists, communists and anarchists into a new "national unanimity" government.

De Gaulle emphasized the role that the French had in the liberation. De Gaulle drove the necessity for the French people to do their "duty of war" by advancing into the Benelux countries and Germany. He wanted France to be among "the victors", a belief that they escaped the fate of having a new constitution imposed by the AMGOT threat like those that would be established in Germany and Japan in 1945.

Although Paris was liberated, there was still heavy fighting elsewhere in France. Large portions of the country were still occupied after the successful Operation Dragoon in southern France, which extended into the south-western region of the Vosges Mountains from 15 August to 14 September. Fighting went on in Alsace and Lorraine in eastern France during the last months of 1944 until the early months of 1945.

Legal purge

Several alleged Vichy loyalists involved in the Milice, a paramilitary militia established by Sturmbannführer Joseph Darnand that hunted the Resistance along with the Gestapo, were made prisoners in a post-liberation purge known as the Épuration légale (Legal purge). Some were executed without trial. Women accused of "horizontal collaboration" because of alleged sexual relationships with Germans were arrested and had their heads shaved, were publicly exhibited and some were allowed to be mauled by mobs.

On 17 August, the Germans took Pierre Laval to Belfort. On 20 August, under German military escort, Marshal Philippe Pétain was forcibly moved to Belfort, and to the Sigmaringen enclave in Germany on 7 September; there, 1,000 of his followers (including Louis-Ferdinand Céline) joined him. They established the government of Sigmaringen, challenging the legitimacy of de Gaulle's Provisional Government of the French Republic. As a sign of protest over his forced move, Pétain refused to take office, and was eventually replaced by Fernand de Brinon. The Vichy government in exile ended in April 1945.

Legacy

60th, 70th and 75th anniversaries of the liberation
On 25 August 2004, two military parades reminiscent of the parades of 26 and 29 August 1944, one in commemoration of the 2nd Armored Division, the other of the US 4th Infantry Division, and featuring armoured vehicles from the era, were held on the 60th anniversary of the Liberation of Paris. Under the auspices of the Senate, a jazz concert and popular dancing took place in the Jardin du Luxembourg. In the same event, homage was paid to the Spanish contribution – the first time in 60 years. Paris Mayor Bertrand Delanoë laid a plaque on a wall along the River Seine at the Quai Henri IV in the presence of surviving Spanish veterans, Javier Rojo the President of the Senate of Spain and a delegation of Spanish politicians.

On 25 August 2014, plaques were placed on the Boulevard Saint-Michel and neighboring streets, in the vicinity of the Luxembourg Palace, seat of the French Senate, where combatants had been killed in August 1944. There was dancing in the street in every neighborhood of the French capital and Place de la Bastille, as well as a son et lumière spectacle and dancing on the Place de l'Hôtel de Ville in the evening.

On 25 August 2019 many acts in commemoration of the liberation of Paris focused on the role of the Spanish soldiers of "La Nueve" (Spanish for 'Nine'). The mayor of Paris, Anne Hidalgo, herself descendant of Spanish Republican veterans, emphasized during the inauguration of a fresco that it has taken too long to recognize this chapter of the French history.

Homage to the liberation martyrs

On 16 May 2007, following his election as President of the Fifth French Republic, Nicolas Sarkozy organized an homage to the 35 French Resistance martyrs executed by the Germans on 16 August 1944. French historian Max Gallo narrated the events that took place in the woods of Bois de Boulogne, and a Parisian schoolgirl read 17-year-old French resistant Guy Môquet's final letter. During his speech, Sarkozy announced that this letter would be read in all French schools to remember the resistance spirit. After the speech, the chorale of the French Republican Guard closed the homage ceremony by singing the French Resistance's anthem "Le Chant des Partisans" ("The Partisans' song"). Following this occasion, the new president traveled to Berlin to meet German chancellor Angela Merkel, as a symbol of the Franco-German reconciliation.

In popular culture

La Libération de Paris
La Libération de Paris ("The Liberation of Paris"), whose original title was L'Insurrection Nationale inséparable de la Libération Nationale ("The National Insurrection inseparable from the National Liberation"), was a short 30-minute documentary film secretly shot between 16 and 27 August by the French Resistance. It was released in French theatres on 1 September.

Postal material 

On 8 September 1945, the U.S. Post Office issued a three-cent stamp commemorating the liberation of Paris from the Germans. First day covers were illustrated with images of the Ludendorff Bridge illustrating its capture. Other countries have issued stamps commemorating the bridge's capture, including Nicaragua, Guyana, Micronesia, and Republic of the Marshall Islands.

Filmography
 La Libération de Paris black-and-white film (1944)
 The Liberation of Paris color film (1944) by George Stevens showing the final city shootouts, de Gaulle's triumphal arrival, arrested Germans in the streets of the city and victory parade
 Is Paris Burning? (1966)
 Diplomacy (2014)

See also

 Anthony Faramus
 Camp Gurs
 Camp de Rivesaltes
 Concentration camps in France
 Drancy internment camp
 Fort de Romainville
 Liberation of France
 Mémorial du maréchal Leclerc de Hauteclocque et de la Libération de Paris
 Military history of France during World War II
 Paris in World War II
 Prague uprising
 Warsaw Uprising

References

Further reading
 Argyle, Ray. The Paris Game: Charles de Gaulle, the Liberation of Paris, and the Gamble that Won France (Dundurn, 2014); online review.
 Bishop, Cécile. "Photography, Race and Invisibility: The Liberation of Paris, in Black and White." Photographies 11.2-3 (2018): 193–213; most of De Gaulle's troops were Africans. online
 Blumenson, Martin. "Politics and the Military in the Liberation of Paris." Parameters 28.2 (1998): 4+ online.
 Blumenson, Martin. Breakout and Pursuit, in the series "United States Army in World War II: The European Theater of Operations" (Washington: US Army, Office of the Chief of Military History, 1963) online
 Cobb, Matthew. Eleven days in August : the liberation of Paris in 1944 (2014) online
 Clark, Catherine E. "Capturing the moment, picturing history: photographs of the liberation of Paris." American Historical Review 121.3 (2016): 824–860.
 Keegan, John. Six Armies In Normandy: From D-Day to the Liberation of Paris June 6th-August 25th, 1944 (Random House, 2011). online
 Keith, Susan. "Collective memory and the end of occupation: Remembering (and forgetting) the liberation of Paris in images." Visual Communication Quarterly 17.3 (2010): 134–146.
 Smith, Jean Edward. The Liberation of Paris: How Eisenhower, De Gaulle, and Von Choltitz Saved the City of Light (Simon & Schuster, 2020) excerpt, by a leading scholar.
 Thornton, Willis. "The Liberation of Paris." History Today (Dec 1959) 9#12 pp 800–811.
 Thornton, Willis. The Liberation of Paris (Harcourt, Brace and World, 1962), scholarly book.
 Tucker-Jones, Anthony. Operation Dragoon: The Liberation of Southern France, 1944 (Casemate Publishers, 2010).
 Zaloga, Steven J. Liberation of Paris 1944: Patton’s race for the Seine (Bloomsbury, 2011).

External links
 online films--primary sources
 Liberation of Paris – Official French website (in English)
 Battle for Paris: August 16–26, Documentary shot by the French Resistance, 1 September 1944
 De Gaulle's speech from the Hôtel de Ville – Charles de Gaulle foundation
 De Gaulle's speech in retrospect – BBC News
 Paris Liberated: Rare, Unpublished  – slideshow by Life
 Primout, Gilles. "19–25 août 1944... La Libération de Paris " (in French)  – provides archival documents and a detailed timeline

Paris
Paris
Paris
Paris
Paris
Paris
Military history of France during World War II
Paris
Paris
Paris
Paris
Military history of Paris
August 1944 events
Insurgencies in Paris